Aleksei Borisovich Stukalov (born 24 November 1983) is a Russian football coach. He is the manager of FC Rotor Volgograd.

Coaching career
On 9 April 2021 he signed a contract with Russian Premier League club FC Ufa until the summer of 2023. On his RPL coaching debut on 10 April 2021, Ufa defeated FC Akhmat Grozny 3–0. In his second game on 18 April 2021, Ufa won 3–0 again, this time away against FC Spartak Moscow.

Stukalov left Ufa by mutual consent on 30 May 2022 following their relegation from the Russian Premier League.

On 27 June 2022, Stukalov signed with FC Rotor Volgograd.

Personal life
His father Boris Stukalov is a football manager as well.

References

External links
 Profile by Russian Premier League
 Profile by Soccerway

1983 births
Sportspeople from Stavropol
Living people
Russian football managers
FC Sokol Saratov managers
FC Ufa managers
FC Rotor Volgograd managers
Russian Premier League managers